The Graves Nunataks are a small group of nunataks near the edge of the Antarctic polar plateau, lying  east-southeast of Beard Peak, La Gorce Mountains, in the Queen Maud Mountains of Antarctica. It was mapped by the United States Geological Survey from surveys and U.S. Navy air photos, 1960–63, and was named by the Advisory Committee on Antarctic Names for Gerald V. Graves of U.S. Navy Squadron VX-6, a photographer on Operation Deep Freeze 1966 and 1967.

References

Nunataks of Marie Byrd Land